Sefton railway station is located on the Main South line, serving the Sydney suburb of Sefton. The station is heritage-listed in the state heritage register for New South Wales. It is served by Sydney Trains T3 Bankstown line services.

History
Sefton station opened on 19 October 1924 when the Lidcombe to Regent's Park line was extended to Cabramatta to become part of the Main South line. The station building is of a characteristic standard design from the 1920s and 1930s. The station was further expanded in the following years, with booking and parcels offices installed on the footbridge in 1928.

The station has undergone changes over the years as the importance of the station decreased and its urban context changed. The buildings on the footbridge were removed. Flower boxes, hedges and trees on the platform were removed. An awning was erected at the end of the 20th century to connect the footbridge landing with the main station building. In 2009, as part of the construction of the Southern Sydney Freight Line, major works were carried out in and around the station, including reconstruction of part of the footbridge, and the installation of lifts.

Service history
From inception, passenger services at Sefton connected it directly to Lidcombe, Strathfield and the City Circle (later known as the Inner West Line). With the completion of the Bankstown Line extension from Birrong, a small number of services were added through the station between Liverpool and Bankstown. These were gradually increased, progressively replacing services on the Inner West Line until they were eliminated in October 2013 except for two trains eastbound and one train westbound on weekday mornings. A current project is underway to convert most of the Bankstown Line to a rapid transit line. As a result, direct trains to the City via Lidcombe and Strathfield are planned to be restored for the remaining heavy rail stations, including Sefton.

Platforms & services
Today Sefton is served by T3 Bankstown line services terminating at Liverpool and three Liverpool – City via Strathfield services on weekdays.

Transport links
Transdev NSW operates one route via Sefton station:
S2: to Granville station

Sefton station is served by one NightRide route:
N50: Liverpool station to Town Hall station

Trackplan

References

External links

Sefton station details Transport for New South Wales

City of Canterbury-Bankstown
Easy Access railway stations in Sydney
Railway stations in Sydney
Railway stations in Australia opened in 1924
Main Southern railway line, New South Wales